No. 207 (General Purpose) Group was a group of the Royal Air Force (RAF) established on 15 December 1941 by downgrading the British RAF Command known as Air H.Q. East Africa to Group status. The group was commanded by Air Commodore William Sowrey until June 1942 when Air Commodore Malcolm Taylor took over.

No. 207 (General Purpose) GroupAir Commodore Malcolm TaylorOrder of Battle27 October 1942

On 16 November 1942, the Group was upgraded to Command status and again became Air H.Q. East Africa. Following the Casablanca Conference-directed reorganization of the Allied air forces in the North African and Mediterranean Theater of Operations (MTO) effective 18 February 1943, Air H.Q. East Africa was a sub-command of RAF Middle East Command, itself a sub-command of the Mediterranean Air Command.

References

Royal Air Force groups